The Uganda Energy Credit Capitalisation Company (UECCC) is a company owned by the government of Uganda. It is responsible for coordinating funding from the Ugandan government, international development partners and the private sector, to invest in renewable energy infrastructure in Uganda, with emphasis on the promotion of private sector participation.

Location
UECCC's headquarters is located in Amber House, at 29-33 Kampala Road, in the centre of Kampala, Uganda's capital and largest city. The coordinates of the company headquarters are 00°18'48.0"N, 32°34'55.0"E (Latitude:0.313340; Longitude:32.581949).

Overview
The company was established in 2009 and coordinates investment into renewable energy sources in the country. The company offers technical, financial, and advisory services to the lending financial institution and to the renewable energy project developer. Services offered include the following: (a) Liquidity refinance option (b) Cash reserving (c) Partial risk guarantee (d) Solar refinance facility to participating microfinance institutions (e) Bridge financing facility (f) Subordinated debt finance (g) Interest rate buy down and (h) Transaction advisory services. Participating international development partners include the World Bank and KfW.

Ownership
The company is jointly owned by the Uganda Ministry of Energy and Mineral Development and the Uganda Ministry of Finance, Planning and Economic Development. As of July 2019, the company's total assets were USh100 billion (US$27 million). At that time the company was involved in developing nine mini-hydroelectric power stations in the country, that were yet to come online.

See also

Energy in Uganda
Economy of Uganda
List of power stations in Uganda
Ministry of Energy and Mineral Development (Uganda)

References

External links 
Website of Uganda Energy Credit Capitalisation Company
Website of Uganda Ministry of Energy and Mineral Development

Government-owned companies of Uganda
Energy in Uganda
Organizations established in 2009
Companies based in Kampala
2009 establishments in Uganda
Government finances in Uganda
Energy economics